Ekoka ǃKung (Ekoka ǃXuun, Ekoka-ǃXû, ǃKung-Ekoka) or Western ǃXuun (North-Central Ju) is a variety of the ǃKung dialect cluster, spoken originally in the area of the central Namibian–Angolan border, west of the Okavango River, but since the Angolan Civil War also in South Africa.

Dialects

Heine & Honken (2010) place Ekoka in the Northern–Western branch of ǃXuun (ǃKung), where Ekoka is equivalent to the Western branch. They distinguish three varieties:
Western ǃXuun (Kung-Ekoka)
Tsintsabis (natively ǃxūún; spoken in Tsintsabis, Tsumeb district, N Namibia)
ǀAkhwe (natively ǃxūún, ǀʼākhòè ǃxòān "Kwanyama ǃXuun"; spoken in Eenhana, N Namibia)
[no name] (natively ǃxūún, ǃʼālè ǃxòān "Valley ǃXuun"; spoken in Eenhana district, N Namibia)

Sands et al. place it in its own branch, which they call North-Central Ju:
North-Central Ju (Namibia, between the Ovambo River and the Angolan border, around the tributaries of the Okavango River east of Rundu to the Etosha Pan)
Tsintsabis
ǀʼAkhwe
Okongo
Ovambo
Mpunguvlei

Tsintsabis might actually be Central ǃKung.

Phonology

Consonants
Ekoka ǃKung has an indistinguishable sound system to Juǀʼhoansi. However, the series of palatal clicks,  etc, have a fricated lateral release (see fricated palatal clicks).

These are not common cross-linguistically, but are also found in Taa and ǂHoan.

König & Heine (2001) report the following inventory, with the clicks as analyzed by Miller (2011). One of the click series, called 'fortis' in König & Heine, is only attested at two places of articulation; it is not clear which this corresponds to in the table below. There are also prenasalized  in Bantu loans.

 is shown as post-alveolar; cf. the epiglottalized  found in Juǀ'hoan, though this could be an alignment error.

More recently, Heine & König find that Ekoka ǃKung also has a series of preglottalized nasal consonants, including preglottalized nasal clicks:

Vowels
Ekoka has a full set of modal and murmured (breathy) vowels, as well as pharyngealized back vowels, and a reduced set of modal, murmured, and pharyngealized nasal vowels: 
i e a o u – ih eh ah oh uh – aq oq uq – in an un – ahn ohn – aqn oqn uqn

Grammar
Linguistically, ǃKung is generally termed isolating, meaning that words' meanings are changed by the addition of other, separate words, rather than by the addition of affixes or the changing of word structure. A few suffixes exist - for example, distributive plurals are formed with the noun suffix -si or -mhi, but in the main meaning is given only by series of words rather than by grouping of affixes.

ǃKung distinguishes no formal plural, and the suffixes -si and -mhi are optional in usage. For example, the plant genus Grewia is referred to by five different words, representing five different species in this genus.

References

Sources 
Bernd Heine & Christa König, 2010. The ǃXun language: A dialect grammar. Cologne: Rüdiger Köppe Verlag.
König, Christa and Bernd Heine. 2008. A concise dictionary of northwestern !Xun. (Quellen zur Khoisan-Forschung, 21.) Köln: Rüdiger Köppe.
 Amanda Miller et al., 2011, "The Phonetics of the Modernday reflexes of the Proto‐palatal click in Juu languages" (Ekoka and Mangetti Dune)
Miller, Sands, et al., 2010. "Retroflex Clicks in Two Dialects of ǃXung" (Grootfontein and Ekoka)

External links
Ekoka basic lexicon at the Global Lexicostatistical Database

Kx'a languages